Blanka Kiss (born 22 June 1996) is a Hungarian sprint canoeist.

She won a medal at the 2019 ICF Canoe Sprint World Championships.

References

External links

1996 births
Living people
Hungarian female canoeists
ICF Canoe Sprint World Championships medalists in kayak
People from Esztergom
European Games competitors for Hungary
Canoeists at the 2019 European Games
Sportspeople from Komárom-Esztergom County
20th-century Hungarian women
21st-century Hungarian women